, also known as Doraemon and the Galaxy Express, is a feature-length Doraemon film which premiered in Japan on March 3 1996, based on the 16th volume of the same name of the Doraemon Long Stories series. The film is a homage of Leiji Matsumoto's Galaxy Express 999. It's the 17th Doraemon film. The film was directed by Tsutomu Shibayama.

Plot
In the park where they normally meet, Suneo invites Gian and Shizuka to his trip to Express Train. Nobita appears looking very worried as Doraemon has been missing for a few days. Nobita returns home to learn that Doraemon has arrived. Doraemon explains that he had acquired tickets for a Galactic Express Train from 22nd century, where the train's destination and travelling time is unknown. 

After Nobita expresses concerns about missing school, Doraemon reassures him that he can use Anywhere Door. The next day, Nobita invites his friends to the Galaxy Express. Gian and Shizuka agree, except Suneo, who wants them to join him instead. Though hesitant at first, Suneo also joins them. The train has 58 carriages though 8 are visible from outside. Each carriage has 5 rooms. Nobita and his friends stay in Carriage no. 7. Once the train reaches its destination planet, the carriages separate. The friends disperse in different play planets. Nobita and Doraemon enjoy shooting lessons while Gian and Suneo face misery in learning Ninja techniques.

Meanwhile, an evil force of parasites called Yadori is planning to make humans their hosts by taking over their bodies. A few days later, the first case of parasites is reported when the robot-dinosaurs at the planet start acting strangely. They decide to report about it to the Control Center in the Main Planet. Nobita and his friends find out smoke coming out from the Main Control Center. When Gian and Suneo are in the main control center to investigate what happened, Suneo is captured by the parasites and taken control by Yadori 009. Yadori 009 tricks his friends and locks them up after which Yadori 007 reveals that Yadori is set to conquer the galaxy. After Yadori force leaves, the captain of the train rescues the captives and decides to take the train to another planet for safety. 

However, the train crashes en route on an abandoned planet. On the planet, the captain finds an electronic cave map which Gian later follows to explore caves, but ends up getting lost along with two future kids. Shizuka finds an anti-Yadori gun which they use on Yadori 009, who has jumped from Suneo's body to Nobita's. They also relocate Gian through his footprints and manage to get the train out of the mountain. Gian also discovers a lost train whose functioning engine is used for the Galaxy Express. When they are preparing to leave, Yadori force finds and attacks them. A huge Yadori robot attacks the group resulting in an epic battle, but the group fights and defeats the whole force thus freeing all the people from the parasites and the President thanks the group.

The future kids reconcile with Nobita and his group, where the group arrives back at their planet and bid farewell to the Galaxy Express.

Cast

References

External links 
 Doraemon The Movie 25th page 
 

Films directed by Tsutomu Shibayama
1996 films
1996 anime films
Nobita and the Galaxy Super-express
Films scored by Shunsuke Kikuchi
Films set on fictional planets
1996 animated films
Animated films about cats
Animated films about extraterrestrial life
Animated films about robots